Alacritech was a Silicon Valley company which marketed "intelligent" network interface controllers (NICs) to offload TCP/IP processing from the CPU of computer systems to dedicated hardware on the NIC: a concept now known as a TCP offload engine (TOE).  Later it manufactured storage network products. Alacritech's main products were the ANX 1500 series of network throughput acceleration appliances.

History
Alacritech was founded in 1997 by Larry Boucher, the author of the SCSI standard and founder of both Auspex Systems and Adaptec. The company's network interface cards (NICs) were promoted for enhanced performance by moving some TCP/IP processing from the CPU to the NIC. In 2004, Alacritech sued Microsoft and Broadcom for patent infringement.  The suits were settled in 2005 with both companies agreeing to license the Alacritech patents.

In 2008 Alacritech decided that the TOE / NIC business was not sufficient to sustain a viably growing company, and changed its focus to leveraging this technology for accelerating of network attached storage (NAS), resulting in the development of the ANX series of appliances.

Appliances 
The ANX 1500 throughput acceleration appliance supported TCP/IP, NFS, DHCP and 10GbE standards and features 48GB of DRAM and up to 4TB of solid state drives. The ANX 1500 caches active data stemming from client requests, such as frequent access of the same payload data or NFS metadata, and optimizes performance through the use of TCP and NFS Offload technology embedded in Alacritech's custom silicon. The ANX 1500 has a two-tiered caching system that provides record performance by accelerating READ and NFS metadata-intensive OPS, greatly reducing the burden on existing NAS devices, and enabling better WRITE performance and scalability. With a performance layer based on frequency of use, NFS OPS are maximized, resulting in reduced traffic on backend NAS servers, and a dramatic reduction in total IOPS required and storage drives needed from back-end storage.

The ANX 1500 accelerates NFS throughput and enhances the performance of existing NAS boxes. A single ANX 1500, with 4TB of SSDs, can deliver 120,000 NFS SPECsfs2008 operations per second (OPS) and an ORT of .92ms and only requires 1/5 of the NAS infrastructure otherwise required to deliver the comparable NFS OPS performance. The appliance allows enterprises to achieve significantly higher disk utilization, using 80 percent of available disk space, versus the current standard of 20 percent in performance environments.

Present operation
The company did not achieve sufficient sales of the ANX product line to sustain ongoing operations and development, and shut down manufacturing and development operations in November 2013.  The company website currently notes that the ANX product line is no longer being manufactured, but provides links for support of existing installations.  As of 2018 the company was in the business of licensing its technology.

References

External links
Alacritech, Inc. website

Networking companies of Canada